Elisabeth Gerle (born December 8, 1951) is Professor of ethics with a special focus on human rights at Uppsala University and Ethicist at the Research Department, Church of Sweden. She has spent several years at Princeton University as visiting scholar, first at The Center of International Relations and then at Princeton Theological Seminary. Since she returned to Sweden in 1995 she has lived in Lund and worked as senior ethicist and associate professor and lecturer at Lund and Malmö University in Ethics and Human Rights. During 2001–2005 she was dean of the Pastoral Institute in Lund. Her Lund office is situated at the Raoul Wallenberg Institute.

In 2003, Gerle was elected Member och the Science Society in Lund.

Since 2014 she is visiting scholar at Stellenbosch University of Advanced Studies, STIAS, in South Africa, collaborating with Sarojini Nadar from UKZN.

References

External links

21st-century Swedish philosophers
Swedish women philosophers
Lutheran philosophers
Christian ethicists
Living people
1951 births
Academic staff of Stellenbosch University
Swedish Lutheran theologians
20th-century Protestant theologians
21st-century Protestant theologians
Swedish women academics
Women Christian theologians
Academic staff of Malmö University